Dale Fuller (born Marie Dale Phillipps; June 17, 1885 – October 14, 1948) was an American actress of the silent era. She appeared in more than 60 films between 1915 and 1935. She is best known for her role as the maid in Foolish Wives.

Early life
Marie Dale Phillipps was born in Santa Ana, California on June 17, 1885. She attended convent schools in Los Angeles and Chicago. Fan magazines from the time claimed that she attended and graduated from Mills College, and Myrtle Gebhardt reported that Fuller lost her family at 19. Fuller said family illness brought her to California, where she decided to act.

Career
In 1908, she performed as a soubrette in the comedy The Trouper. She then joined the cast of Harry Bulgur’s The Flirting Princess, a musical revue, in 1910 and toured with it off and on throughout San Francisco, Chicago, Washington, and Rhode Island. The same year, she performed in the chorus of Florenz Ziegfeld’s The Girl in the Kimona in Chicago. She received good reviews for her performance, with Variety singling her out for praise. 

In 1915, Fuller was introduced to Mack Sennett by Charlie Murray and joined Mack Sennett’s Keystone as an extra, with Sennett's often casting her as a harridan or victim in shorts. Fuller would also occasionally play old men and boy roles due to her plain, boyish appearance and small stature. The following year, she acted with Fred Mace in the short Bath Tub Perils and suffered two broken ribs during the flood sequence. 

In 1920, Fuller left Keystone and began appearing in Chester Comedy films. Around this time, the Austrian film director Erich von Stroheim discovered her and cast her as a maid in Foolish Wives. During production, Fuller lost a substantial amount of weight and was hospitalized for double pneumonia. Her small part garnered positive reviews, with critics' saying her performance was the best part of the film. After the success of Foolish Wives, Fuller appeared in Manslaughter, One Wonderful Night, and Borderland.

Von Stroheim wrote a small part for her in his film Merry-Go-Round, and although her part was drastically cut from the picture, she still received good reviews for her portrayal. She next appeared in His Hour, the Elinor Glyn film Three Weeks, and von Stroheim's film McTeague, which later was renamed Greed. The studio cut most of her scenes from the film, but MGM added her to the stock company of actors that year. Fuller continued to work with von Stroheim, playing a chambermaid in his 1925 film The Merry Widow and as Fay Wray's mother in The Wedding March.

Fuller played Renée Adorée's mother in The Cossacks, and acted in Thomas Meighan's film The Canadian as Gertie. Her last film was A Tale of Two Cities, in which she played an uncredited role.

Personal life and death
Fuller was reserved and shy, which prevented her from promoting herself as an actress, which could have helped her career. She spent most of her time on her citrus farm near Covina, where she raised chickens, doves, canaries, dogs, cats, and a parrot. 

Fuller died on October 14, 1948 in Pomona of valvular heart disease. She is interred at Forest Lawn Memorial Park in Glendale, California.

Partial filmography

 Foolish Wives (1922) - Maruschka
 Borderland (1922) - Elly
 Manslaughter (1922) - Prisoner
 Robin Hood (1922) - Peasant (uncredited)
 One Wonderful Night (1922) - Maid
 Souls for Sale (1923) - Abigail Tweedy
 Merry-Go-Round (1923) - Marianka Huber
 Tea: With a Kick! (1923) - Kittie Wiggle - Reformer
 Reno (1923) - Aunt Alida Kane
 The Marriage Circle (1924) - Neurotic Patient
 Three Weeks (1924) - Anna
 Babbitt (1924) - Tillie
 His Hour (1924) - Olga Gleboff
 Husbands and Lovers (1924) - Marie
 Greed (1924) - Maria
 Tomorrow's Love (1925) - Maid
 The Devil's Cargo (1925) - Millie
 Lady of the Night (1925) - Miss Carr - Florence's Aunt
 The Woman Hater (1925) - Secretary
 The Merry Widow (1925) - Sadoja's Chambermaid (uncredited)
 The Shadow on the Wall (1925) - The Missus
 The Unchastened Woman (1925) - Hildegarde Sanbury
 The Only Thing (1925) - Governess
 Ben-Hur (1925) - Amrah
 Memory Lane (1926)
 Her Second Chance (1926) - Delia
 Volcano! (1926) - Cédrien
 The Speeding Venus (1926) - Midge Rooney
 Midnight Lovers (1926) - Heatley
 The Canadian (1926) - Gertie Marsh
 The Beauty Shoppers (1927) - Olga
 The King of Kings (1927) - Woman at Crucifixtion (uncredited)
 Fazil (1928) - Zouroya - Keeper of the Harem
 The Cossacks (1928) - Ulitka - Maryana's Mother
 The Wedding March (1928) - Katerina Schrammel - Mitzi's mother
 House of Horror (1929) - Gladys
 Glad Rag Doll (1929) - Miss Peabody
 The Sacred Flame (1929) - Nurse Wayland
 The Man from Blankley's (1930) - Miss Finders
 The Office Wife (1930) - Secretary Andrews
 The Great Meadow (1931) - Pioneer Woman (uncredited)
 Emma (1932) - Maid
 The Trial of Vivienne Ware (1932) - Gossip (uncredited)
 Rasputin and the Empress (1932) - Minor Role (uncredited)
 Face in the Sky (1933) - Clerk, Circleville General Store (uncredited)
 House of Mystery (1934) - Geraldine Carfax
 Twentieth Century (1934) - Sadie
 We Live Again (1934) - Eugenia Botchkova
 A Tale of Two Cities (1935) - Old Hag (uncredited)

References

External links

1885 births
1948 deaths
20th-century American actresses
American film actresses
American silent film actresses
Actresses from Santa Ana, California
Burials at Forest Lawn Memorial Park (Glendale)